The World Federation of Building and Woodworkers' Unions (FMCB) was an International Trade Federation affiliated to the World Confederation of Labour (WCL).

History
The federation was established on 9 September 1937, at a meeting in Paris, when the International Federation of Christian Woodworkers merged with the International Federation of Christian Workers in the Building Trades.  Initially known as the International Federation of Christian Trade Unions of Building and Woodworkers, it adopted its final name in 1973.

In December 2005, the federation merged with the International Federation of Building and Wood Workers, to form the Building and Wood Workers' International.

Leadership

General Secretaries
J. van Eibergen
Gerrit de Lange
1990s: Dick van de Kamp
2000s: Bert van der Spek

Presidents
Kamiel Nuyts
Antoon Desloovere
1998: Jacky Jackers

References

Building and construction trade unions
World Confederation of Labour
Trade unions established in 1937
Trade unions disestablished in 2005